Daan Schijvers (18 September 1941 – 2 August 2018) was a Dutch footballer who played as a defender in his native Netherlands. He was also capped for the Netherlands national team 22 times.

Club career
Born in Breda, Schrijvers started and finished his career at hometown club NAC, making his debut in 1960 and playing 169 games for the club. He also played for DWS with whom he won the league before joining PSV in 1965. He played 134 matches for the Eindhovenaren before returning to NAC in 1970.

International career
Schrijvers made his debut for the Netherlands national team in a September 1962 friendly match against the Netherlands Antilles and earned a total of 22 caps, scoring one goal. His final international was a September 1966 friendly against Austria. He became skipper of the national team in 1964.

References

External links
 

1941 births
2018 deaths
Footballers from Breda
Dutch footballers
Association football defenders
Netherlands international footballers
Eredivisie players
NAC Breda players
AFC DWS players
PSV Eindhoven players